Lisdon Jules (born 11 March 1990) is a Grenadian footballer who plays as a forward for Hard Rock in the Grenadian Premier Division and the Grenada national team.

International career
Jules earned his first international cap at the 2013 Windward Islands Tournament, scoring once during a 2–1 victory over Saint Lucia. He made one more appearance in the competition, against Saint Vincent and the Grenadines. Grenada were the eventual champions. He was also called up for the 2014 Windward Islands Tournament, and featured in two games.

He subsequently made two more appearances at the 2014 Caribbean Cup qualifiers, in matches against French Guiana and Puerto Rico.

In 2017, Jules was selected to represent national team yet again, ahead of friendlies against Trinidad and Tobago and Bermuda, although he stayed on the bench during both matches.

Honours

Club
Hard Rock
 GFA Premier Division: 2013, 2016

International
Grenada
 Windward Islands Tournament: 2013

Career statistics

International goals
Scores and results list Grenada's goal tally first.

References

External links
 
 Lisdon Jules at CaribbeanFootballDatabase

Living people
1990 births
Grenadian footballers
Grenada international footballers
Association football forwards
Association football defenders